Rigmatin (also Romanized as Rīgmatīn) is a village in Sorkh Qaleh Rural District, in the Central District of Qaleh Ganj County, Kerman Province, Iran. At the 2006 census, its population was 578, in 155 families.

References 

Populated places in Qaleh Ganj County